The International Trademark Association is a global association of brand owners and professionals dedicated to trademarks and complementary intellectual property to foster consumer trust, economic growth, and innovation, and committed to building a better society through brands. 

The Association's nearly 6,500 member organizations from 165 countries represent more than 34,000 trademark professionals and include brand owners from major corporations as well as small and medium-sized enterprises, law firms, and nonprofits. There are also government agency members as well as individual professor and student members.

INTA undertakes advocacy work throughout the world to advance trademarks and offers educational programs and informational and legal resources of global interest.

History 
INTA, originally known as the United States Trademark Association (USTA), was established in November 1878 in New York City by 17 merchants and manufacturers to protect and promote the rights of trademark owners, secure useful legislation, and give aid and encouragement to all efforts for the advancement and observance of trademark rights.

In 1908, the Association became a business corporation under the Business Corporation Law of the State of New York, and it was given broad powers to act for the protection of trademarks in the United States and around the world.

In 1926, the USTA became a not-for-profit member organization.

In 1993, the Association changed its name to the International Trademark Association.

Activities 

INTA provides services to its members and the public in three main areas: global trademark resources, programs & events, and policy & advocacy.

INTA produces digital publications, including the INTA Bulletin and The Trademark Reporter, and multijurisdictional Practice Guides, such as Country Guides, covering various topics and jurisdictions worldwide. Some resources (focusing on the basics of trademark law) are available to the general public, others (on legal practice in jurisdictions worldwide) are exclusively available to members.

The Trademark Reporter is a bi-monthly peer-reviewed scholarly journal that explores all aspects of trademark law, and the INTA Bulletin is INTA's weekly newsletter delivering news about Association activities, and developments and trends in global trademark law. 

INTA hosts meetings, conferences, roundtables, and webcasts that bring international trademark professionals together to discuss trademark issues, and IP law and practice. These events are open to members and non-members. It also hosts a bi-monthly podcast, Brand & New, with host Audrey Dauvet who interviews an international roster of influential experts and visionaries with original ideas and unexpected perspectives.

INTA's largest event is the Annual Meeting, which dates back to 1878. The Meeting takes place every spring—usually in May, attracts more than 10,000 participants from around the globe, and consists of five days of networking and Business Development opportunities, educational and professional development opportunities, as well as committee meetings and exhibits. The 2022 Annual Meeting Live+ will take place April 30-May 4, in-person in Washington, D.C. plus virtually.

INTA works to promote effective trademark laws and policies worldwide. INTA carries out its policy and advocacy work through model laws and guidelines, Board of Directors resolutions, amicus briefs, testimony and submissions, and reports.

The committees of INTA's Advocacy Group are:

 Anticounterfeiting
 Brands and Innovation
 Copyright
 Data Protection
 Designs
 Emerging Issues
 Enforcement
 Famous & Well-Known Marks
 Geographical Indications
 Harmonization of Trademark Law & Practice
 Indigenous Rights
 International Amicus
 Internet
 Legislation & Regulation
 Non-Traditional Marks
 Parallel Imports
 Right of Publicity
 Trademark Office Practices
 Unfair Competition

Structure 

INTA is led by a Board of Directors composed of up to 37 representatives of member organizations. The Board elects several officers and works with the CEO and staff, along with the member volunteers who serve on committees to implement the Association's strategic plan. Zeeger Vink (MF Brands, Switzerland) is the INTA  2022 President. The Board appoints committees that conduct the work of the Association. Any individual who works for a member organization is eligible to apply for committee membership.

Membership 

INTA members include nearly 6,500 organizations from 185 countries. The Association's member organizations represent more than 34,000 trademark professionals working at:

 major corporations;
 small- and medium-sized enterprises;
 law firms, service firms and sole practitioners;
 nonprofits; 
 government offices; and
 academic institutions.

INTA's locations 

The Association has headquarters in New York City, offices in Brussels, Beijing, Santiago, Chile, Singapore, and Washington, D.C., and a representative in New Delhi.

In 2003, INTA opened its China Representative Office in Shanghai: the first office outside the United States. The Office moved to Beijing in 2021.

In 2006, INTA opened its Europe Representative Office in Brussels, Belgium.

In 2007, INTA opened a representative office in Washington, D.C.

In 2016, INTA opened its Asia Pacific Representative Office in Singapore. 

In 2017, INTA opened its Latin American and Caribbean Representative Office in Santiago, Chile.

INTA Annual Meeting 

INTA's largest event is the annual meeting, which dates back to 1878. The meeting takes place every spring—usually in May, attracts participants from around the globe, and consists of five days of networking, educational and professional development opportunities, as well as committee meetings and exhibits. The Annual Meeting is the world's largest gathering of brand owners and intellectual property professionals. INTA's 142nd Annual Meeting takes place April 25–29 in Singapore.

See also 
 Trademarks
 Brands
 Intellectual Property
 Trade Association
 Intellectual property organization
 Trademark attorney

References

External links
 

Intellectual property organizations
Organizations established in 1878
1878 establishments in New York (state)